XHATV-FM is a radio station on 104.3 FM in Álamo Temapache, Veracruz. XHATV-FM is owned by Ageo Hernández Hernández and carries a Christian talk format known as "Unción FM".

History
XHATV-FM received its concession on March 8, 2018, and the station signed on July 5, 2018. It had previously broadcast as a pirate on 104.7.

References

2018 establishments in Mexico
Radio stations established in 2018
Radio stations in Veracruz
Christian radio stations in Mexico